Car Wash is a 1976 American comedy film released by Universal Pictures. Directed by Michael Schultz from a screenplay by Joel Schumacher, the film stars Franklyn Ajaye, Bill Duke, George Carlin, Irwin Corey, Ivan Dixon, Antonio Fargas, Jack Kehoe, Clarence Muse, Lorraine Gary, The Pointer Sisters,  Richard Pryor, and Garrett Morris. Originally conceived as a musical, Car Wash is an episodic comedy about a day in the lives of a close-knit group of employees at a Los Angeles, California car wash (filmed at a Westlake car wash at the corner of Rampart Boulevard and 6th Street) and their boss, Leon "Mr. B" Barrow (Sully Boyar).

Plot
Over a single Friday in July, the Dee-Luxe Car Wash hosts all manner of strange visitors, including a hysterical wealthy woman from Beverly Hills dealing with a carsick son. Money-hungry evangelist "Daddy Rich", who preaches a pseudo-gospel of prosperity theology, appears with his loyal (and singing) entourage, The Wilson Sisters. One main character is Abdullah Mohammed Akbar, formerly Duane, a tall Black revolutionary and recent convert to Islam who dismisses Daddy Rich's preaching when the quartet visit and collect donations from the employees. Among many other misadventures, the employees must deal with a man they believe is the notorious "pop bottle bomber" being sought that day by the police. It alarms employees, customers, and the owner of the car wash, Leon "Mr. B" Barrow, but the strange man's "bomb" turns out to be simply a urine sample he is taking to the hospital for a liver test.

Mr. B's son Irwin, a left-wing college student who smokes pot in the men's restroom and carries around a copy of Quotations from Chairman Mao, insists on spending a day with the "working class" employees, whom he considers "brothers" in the "struggle". As he prepares for work, he sets off motion sensors that give him the first "human car wash", which he good-naturedly accepts (though while pot-induced). A taxi driver searches fruitlessly for a prostitute named Marleen, who stiffed him for a fare earlier and has her own hopes shattered later on as a customer with whom she apparently has fallen in love has given her a false telephone number. Meanwhile, middle-aged ex-convict Lonnie, the foreman of the car wash, tries to mentor Abdullah while struggling to raise two young children and fend off his parole officer. Abdullah confronts the flamboyant homosexual Lindy and sharply criticizes his cross-dressing, to which Lindy coolly replies, "Honey, I am more man than you'll ever be and more woman than you'll ever get."

Theodore Chauncey "T.C." Elcott, another young employee, is determined to win a radio call-in contest to win tickets for a rock concert and to convince his estranged girlfriend Mona, a waitress working in a diner across the street, to accompany him, eventually succeeding. Musicians Floyd and Lloyd, who have an audition for an agent when their shift ends, spend the entire movie rehearsing their jazz-blues dance moves in front of bewildered customers. Meanwhile, an employee named Justin clashes with his girlfriend, Loretta, who wants him to return to college, but he declines, feeling that a black man like him will not get anywhere in the world with any kind of education. His elderly grandfather, Snapper, works as the shoe shine man at the car wash and is a follower of Daddy Rich.

Other employees include sly womanizer Geronimo, a thin, African-American with feathers in his hair; cowboy Scruggs, the gas pump operator; overweight, good-natured Hippo, who clearly hooks up with Marleen; a scheming Latino named Chuco; a Native American named Goody, who wears a hat with pig ears; scruffy middle-aged Charlie; con artist and bookie Sly, who later gets arrested right at the car wash for a series of unpaid parking tickets; and the uptight Earl, who sees himself as superior to his colleagues because he does not get wet; he would appear to think that he is the supervisor at the car wash.

Among everything, Mr. B constantly flirts with the young, busty cashier/receptionist Marsha to escape his troubled home life. Constantly tense, he worries about his car wash going out of business due to a competitor a few miles down the street. Lonnie, conversely, has numerous ideas on how to save the car wash, but everyone else, including the miserly Mr. B, ignores him. Later, Abdullah, after being fired by Mr. B for his unexplained absences from work for the past several weeks, appears in the office with a gun while Lonnie is closing up, intending to rob the business. Lonnie dissuades him, and the two commiserate at the status society has imposed on them: two proud men forced to work at a meaningless job for meager pay. The day ends melancholically as everyone goes their separate ways, knowing that they will be back tomorrow to do it all over again.

Cast

Other actors
Danny DeVito and Brooke Adams appeared in the film as Joe and Terry, the owners of a food stand called 'Big Joe's Dog House' which is located next to the car wash. Though they had speaking roles, nearly all of their scenes were deleted from the theatrical version and they are only seen in the background. Their scenes were restored for the edited television version.

The film also featured the speaking voices of local L.A. disc jockeys Jay Butler, J. J. Jackson, Rod McGrew, Sarina C. Grant, and Cleveland's Billy Bass, all heard in the background of the film on the fictional "KGYS" radio station.

Production
The producers originally intended the project to be a stage production, which would feature a replicate car wash on stage, hoping that the project, if successful, could be adapted as a movie. They pitched the idea to Universal's then-president Ned Tanen, who persuaded them to make the film version instead. Joel Schumacher was chosen to write based on his work writing Sparkle.

Unusual for film production, the sound track was recorded prior to filming. The director wanted the actors to actually listen to the same music that would later be added in post-production while filming the scenes.

Reception
The film presently has a score of 89% on Rotten Tomatoes based on 27 reviews, with an average score of 6.8 out of 10.

Roger Ebert gave the film three-and-a-half stars out of four, calling it "a sunny, lively comedy" with a "tremendous sense of life." Vincent Canby of The New York Times called it "a cheerful, somewhat vulgar, very cleverly executed comedy," adding, "Nothing terribly dramatic happens, and some of the comedy gets a bit forced, but the wonder of the film is how it manages to succeed so much of the time." Gene Siskel gave the film three stars out of four and called it "quite entertaining" with "plenty of strong performances." Arthur D. Murphy of Variety wrote, "An enormous, and enormously talented, cast is put through its paces masterfully by director Michael Schultz, making the most of Joel Schumacher's zany screenplay." Charles Champlin of the Los Angeles Times called it "a high-energy, high-entertainment, raucously well-observed slice of life." Sander Vanocur of The Washington Post called it "more than a movie. It's an experience that will make you feel good."

While it did well at the box-office, it still fell short of the high expectations Universal had, probably because of the declining market for black-oriented films at the time.

Since the film's initial release, it has had a small but constant following as a cult film, some notable disciples including Michael Bay and Sandford Bay. The film won the Best Music Award and the Technical Grand Prize at the 1977 Cannes Film Festival plus a nomination for the Palme d'Or. In the same year it was nominated for a Golden Globe, plus it won a Grammy for Best Album of Original Score written for a Motion Picture or Television Special.

Gay film historian Vito Russo cites the character Lindy, played by Antonio Fargas, as being both funny and challenging through his gay militancy. Russo deems Lindy's response to the militant Abdullah as being potentially revolutionary had it not been placed strictly within a comedic context. African American cultural critic Angela Nelson identifies Lindy as a "sophisticated sissy." The "sophisticated sissy" characterization is often used as an easy contrast to the "appropriate" masculine behaviour that heterosexual black male characters are expected to display.

In 2023, Car Wash was named by a group of film experts as one of the 75 most culturally significant films by Black directors.

Music

Car Wash, recorded by Rose Royce, was a major success, yielding three Billboard R&B Top Ten singles: "Car Wash", "I Wanna Get Next to You", and "I'm Going Down". The title track, written and produced by Norman Whitfield, was a #1 hit and was one of the biggest hit singles of the disco era.  Meanwhile, The Pointer Sisters' "You Gotta Believe"—which the group performed during their cameo in the film—was a Top Twenty R&B hit. The Car Wash soundtrack won a 1977 Grammy Award for Best Score Soundtrack Album.

Versions
Car Wash had its network television premiere on NBC Monday Night at the Movies in 1978. Along with the standard dubbing of strong language, many scenes that included the gay character Lindy (Fargas) were trimmed or deleted. To replace these shortened scenes, and therefore shortened film, a subplot of a diner owner (Danny DeVito) (scenes shot for the theatrical version but cut prior to release) were re-inserted. As of 2013, commercially available versions of the movie were of the original theatrical release, not the revised TV version.

Notes

References
 Means Coleman, Robin R. (1998). African American Viewers and the Black Situation Comedy: Situating Racial Humor. Taylor & Francis. .
 Russo, Vito (1987). The Celluloid Closet: Homosexuality in the Movies (rev. ed.). New York, Harper & Row. .

External links 

 
 
 
 

1976 comedy films
1976 films
American comedy films
American LGBT-related films
Blaxploitation films
1970s English-language films
Films directed by Michael Schultz
Films produced by Art Linson
Films set in Los Angeles
Films set in the 1970s
Universal Pictures films
1976 LGBT-related films
Films with screenplays by Joel Schumacher
African-American comedy films
1970s American films